Mary Ann Ashford (1787–1870) was an English cook. She published her memoirs, an account of her life as a domestic servant, Life of a Licensed Victualler's Daughter, which was published in 1844.

References

1787 births
1870 deaths
19th-century English memoirists
19th-century English women writers
English chefs